is a Japanese manga series written and illustrated by Sumomo Yumeka. It was serialized in Shogakukan's shōnen manga magazine Monthly Shōnen Sunday from April 2011 to December 2014.

Publication
Written and illustrated by Sumomo Yumeka, Tetsugaku Letra was serialized in Shogakukan's shōnen manga magazine Monthly Shōnen Sunday from April 12, 2011, to December 12, 2014. Shogakukan collected its chapters in six tankōbon volumes, released from October 12, 2011, to February 12, 2015.

The manga was licensed in Indonesia by Elex Media Komputindo and in France by Kazé.

Volume list

References

External links
 

Shogakukan manga
Shōnen manga
Slice of life anime and manga